Charles Atherton may refer to:

 Charles Atherton (civil engineer) (1805–1875), British civil engineer 
 Charles G. Atherton (1804–1853), Democratic Representative and Senator from New Hampshire
Charles Henry Atherton, (1932–2005), FAIA, was an American architect and former secretary of the U.S. Commission of Fine Arts from 1960 to 2004
 Charles Humphrey Atherton (1773–1853), American lawyer, banker and politician from New Hampshire
  Charles Morgan Herbert Atherton (1874–1935), a Major League Baseball third baseman nicknamed "Prexy"